Sikorsky Glacier is a glacier on the west coast of Graham Land, Antarctica draining northwestwards into Hughes Bay north of Charles Point.

The glacier was photographed by the Falkland Islands and Dependencies Aerial Survey Expedition (FIDASE) in 1956–57, and mapped from these photos by the Falkland Islands Dependencies Survey (FIDS). Named by the United Kingdom Antarctic Place-Names Committee (UK-APC) in 1960 for Igor Sikorsky, American (Russian born) aircraft designer, who has pioneered helicopters since 1909.

Glaciers of Danco Coast